, or officially , is a district of Chiyoda, Tokyo, Japan. As of April 1, 2007, the district's population is 198. Its postal code is 101-0042.

Kanda-Higashimatsushitachō is located on the northeastern part. It borders Kanda-Sudachō to the north, Iwamotochō and Kanda-Iwamotochō to the east, Kanda-Higashikonyachō to the south, Kanda-Konyachō and Kanda-Tomiyamachō to the southwest, and Kanda-Kajichō to the west.

Kanda-Higashimatsushitachō is a business district located near the east exit of the Kanda Station.

Education
 operates public elementary and junior high schools. Chiyoda Elementary School (千代田小学校) is the zoned elementary school for Higashimatsushitachō. There is a freedom of choice system for junior high schools in Chiyoda Ward, and so there are no specific junior high school zones.

References

Districts of Chiyoda, Tokyo